Jeffrey L. Mullins (born March 27, 1963, in Murray, Utah) is an American Thoroughbred racehorse trainer.

References
 Jeff Mullins Horse Trainer - Artist of the Month
 Jeff Mullins at the NTRA
 May 6, 2005; Washington Post Page D09 article titled "Questions Follow Trainer Mullins's Success"
 October 30, 2009 Huffington Post article titled "Jeff Mullins: Horse Trainer Gets Six-Month Ban For Drug Violation"

1963 births
Living people
American horse trainers
People from Murray, Utah